Heidenhain may refer to:

 Heidenhain, a German machine tool manufacturer
 Anna Heidenhain, a German artist
 Martin Heidenhain, a German anatomist, inventor of Heidenhain's AZAN trichrome stain
 Rudolf Heidenhain, a German physiologist and father of Martin Heidenhain